Charles Monteil (22 February 1871 – 20 April 1949) was a French civil servant who combined a career in the administration with studies in the ethnology, languages and history of French West Africa.

Career

Early years (1871–1893)

Charles Monteil was born in Paris on 22 February 1871.
He was the brother of Parfait-Louis Monteil (1855–1925), a French colonial military officer and explorer.
He was admitted to the military academy of Saint-Cyr in 1892.

French West Africa (1893–1902)

Monteil's brother Louis-Parfait took him to French West Africa in 1893, where he began work as a native affairs clerk, and later rose through several administrative levels and held many positions. 
At one time he was the deputy of Maurice Delafosse in the Ivory Coast.
In 1898 Monteil was the first to have collected a soninké version of the legend of Wagadu on the founding of the Mandingo Empire, published in 1967 in an edition edited by Abdoulaye Bathily.
He wrote the answer to the Questionnaire concerning the legal customs of the natives of Africa issued by the Berlin-based International Union of Law and Political Economy and transmitted by the French Colonial Union.
He was promoted to head of the Djenné cercle in May 1901.
Between then and December 1902 he recorded 800 interviews with the educated people of the city, published in Dakar in 1965.

Later career (1902–1949)

Monteil was head of the French Sudan economy and trade office at the Colonial Office in Paris for two years.
He was senior writer at the Caisse des dépôts et consignations in Paris from 1904 to 1911.
He also lectured in Sudanese languages at the National School of Living Oriental Languages (École nationale des langues orientales vivantes) from 1904 to 1909.
He graduated with a degree in law in 1911.
He was a receiver of finance until 1936.
He worked with the Comité des études historiques et scientifiques de l’AOF and the Institut d’Afrique Noire in Dakar, Senegal.
Monteil died in Tulle on 20 April 1949.
His son, Vincent M. Monteil, was also the author of many works about Africa.

Awards

Monteil received awards from the National Agricultural Society of France in 1903, the Geographical Society of Paris in 1916 and 1924 (gold medal), the Institute of France (Academy of Moral and Political Sciences) in 1917 and 1925.
He was made a Chevalier of the Legion of Honour and Officer of the Academy.
He was a holder of the Colonial Medal (Ivory Coast).
He was elected a corresponding members of the Academy of Colonial Sciences from its foundation in 1923.

Publications

Monteil published many books and articles on the languages, history and ethnography of French West Africa.

In an article on La Legende du Wagadu. D'après Tudo Yaresi (1953) Monteil discusses the origin of Dinga, founder of the Ghana Empire, who came from lands in the direction of Mecca, spent some time in Djenné and had many descendants from three marriages.
Monteil suggests that Dinga's family came from Jerusalem and he was descended from Solomon by Yuba (Job).
He was born in Lulami or Durame, spent his youth in Masya, went to Uruguntu where his mother died, and arrived in Louti where he acquired power over the rain, before coming to Djenné.

In a posthumous article on Problems of Western Sudan Monteil presents the hypothesis that modern blacksmiths and singers in West Africa are descended from Judaised blacks, which he bases on the idea of a period of Jewish hegemony in the Maghreb before the Arabs arrived.
These Jews would have first reached Mali as gold traders.
Later, the Judaised Berbers would have fled from the Arabs and then from the Muslim Berbers, moving first to the Adrar of Mauritania and then south of the Senegal River.
The theory is based only on a text by the Arab geographer Muhammad al-Idrisi (1100–65), and on Sudanese local traditions about the origins of the blacksmiths.

His works include:

 Second edition published in 1971 by Anthropos and the Institut International Africain with a preface by his son Vincent Monteil.

Notes

Sources

 

1871 births
1949 deaths
French ethnographers
Linguists from France